is the seventh single by the singer Kotoko for Geneon Entertainment. The title track was used as the final ending theme for the OVA of Maria-sama ga Miteru. The lyrics to this song were written by Konno Oyuki, the creator of Maria-sama ga Miteru, and the melody was composed by the former Megadeth guitarist Marty Friedman.

Track listing 
きれいな旋律 / Kirei na Senritsu—4:00
Composition: Marty Friedman
Arrangement: Tomoyuki Nakazawa, Maiko Iuchi
Lyrics: Oyuki Konno
Rush—4:13
Composition: Kotoko
Arrangement: C.G mix
Lyrics: Kotoko
きれいな旋律 (Instrumental) / Kirei na Senritsu (Instrumental) -- 3:59
Rush (Instrumental) -- 4:11

Charts and sales

References

2007 singles
2007 songs
Kotoko (singer) songs
Anime songs
Song recordings produced by I've Sound
Songs written by Marty Friedman